Matthias Richter (born 18 January 1988 in Detmold, North Rhine-Westphalia), better known by his stage name Tujamo, is a German electro house music producer and DJ. Tujamo, along with Plastik Funk and Sneakbo, released the single "Dr. Who!", which peaked at number 21 on the UK Singles Chart. He also had a hit with Steve Aoki and Chris Lake, "Boneless", which charted at #49 on the German Singles Chart and #42 on the Austrian Singles Chart.

Background
Tujamo was born Matthias Richter in 1988 in Detmold, Germany. He began DJing at age 17 and in 2006 participated in and won a talent competition hosted by Club Index in Schüttorf, where he became a resident DJ. He began using the Tujamo moniker that same year and released his debut single, "Mombasa", in 2011. His first hit, "Who", was originally released in 2011 in collaboration with Plastik Funk, also from Germany. It became a large hit at the Winter Music Conference, a Miami house club. In 2014, his single "Boneless", released in collaboration with Steve Aoki and Chris Lake, charted at number 49 on the German Singles Chart and number 42 on the Dutch Singles Chart. The same year, he reworked "Who" as "Dr. Who!" with vocals from British rapper Sneakbo and it charted at number 21 on the UK Singles Chart, receiving support from Avicii, Tiësto, Fedde Le Grand and Steve Aoki. He has also remixed songs by Bob Sinclar, Peter Gelderblom and Wynter Gordon and has played all over Germany and globally, including South America, Turkey, Brazil and Russia. Some of his other singles include "How We Roll", "Do It All Night", "Back 2 You" and a cover version of Laserkraft 3D's "Nein Mann".

Beatport 
In 2019, Tujamo became the all-time best-selling artist of the electro house genre at Beatport.

Discography

Charted singles

Non-charted singles
2009
 Beat Back

2010
 Switch It
 Mombasa

2011
 Do It All Night
 Back 2 You (with Robell Parker)

2012
 How We Roll
 Crump

2014
 Darth Theme (by John Williams)

2015
 Beat Back (Crazy Flute Mix)
 All Night (with Jacob Plant; Fly Eye)

2016
 Keep Pushin' (featuring Inaya Day; Spinnin' Records)

2017
 Make U Love Me (Spinnin' Records)
 One On One (featuring Sorana; Spinnin' Records)

2018
 Body Language (featuring Miranda Glory and Haris; Spinnin' Records)
 Funk You (with La Fuente; Spinnin' Records)
 With U (Official Untold Festival Anthem 2018) (featuring Karen Harding; Spinnin' Records)
 Jook It (with Salvatore Ganacci featuring Richie Loop; Spinnin' Records)
Say What You Wanna (Spinnin' Records)

2019
 Get Up (Musical Freedom)
 Candy on the Dancefloor (Spinnin' Records)
 Getting Money (featuring 808Charmer; Spinnin' Records)
 Hell Yeah (Smash the House)
 Drop It (with Lukas Vane; Spinnin' Records)
 Shake It (with Nø Signe; Spinnin' Records)

2020
 One Million (with Lotten; Spinnin' Records)
 Taking You Home (with Kelvyn Colt; Universal Music)
 Enough of You (Universal Music)

2021
 I Don't Wanna Go (Universal Music)
 Nasty (with PBH & Jack; Spinnin' Records)

2022
 Down (Spinnin' Records)
 Click (Musical Freedom)

Remixes
2010
 Tujamo - Auf gehts (Tujamo Remix)
 Shemian - 24 Hours (Tujamo Remix)
 Jochen Pash - From London to Detroit (Tujamo Remix)
2011
 Disfunktion - Dead Pixels (Tujamo Remix)
 Jim Tonique & Patrick Bryze - Better World (Tujamo Club Mix)
 Housepussies - Zora In Red (Tujamo Remix)
 Horny United featuring Philippe Heithier - Only You (Tujamo Remix)
 Ralph Good featuring Polina Griffith - SOS (Tujamo Remix)
 Boogie Pimps - Knocking (Tujamo Remix)
 Peter Gelderblom featuring Dominica - I Gotta Let U Go (Tujamo Remix)
 Tiko's Groove featuring Gosha - I Can't Get Nothing (Plastik Funk & Tujamo Remix)
 Fragma - Toca's Miracle (Tujamo Remix)
 Plastik Funk & Fragma - What Love Can Do (Tujamo Remix)
2012
 Bob Sinclar - Groupie (Tujamo Remix)
 Bastian van Shield - Nobody (Tujamo Remix)
 Dubvision - All By Myself (Tujamo Remix)
 Federico Scavo & Andrea Guzzoletti - Strump (Tujamo Remix)
2013
 Major Lazer - Jet Blue Jet (Tujamo Remix)
2014
 Laidback Luke & Martin Solveig - BLOW (Tujamo Remix)
 Deadmau5 - The Reward Is Cheese (Tujamo Remix)
 Jack Ü featuring Kiesza - Take Ü There (Tujamo Remix)
2015
 Laidback Luke featuring Goodgrip - Rocking With The Best (Tujamo Remix)
 Pep & Rash - Rumors (Tujamo Remix)
 Showtek featuring MC Ambush - 90s By Nature (Tujamo Remix)
 Dimitri Vegas & Like Mike featuring Ne-Yo - Higher Place (Tujamo Remix)
 Martin Solveig featuring Sam White - +1 (Tujamo Remix)
2017
 David Guetta featuring Nicki Minaj & Lil Wayne - Light My Body Up (Tujamo Remix)
 David Guetta featuring Justin Bieber - 2U (Tujamo Remix)
2019
 Tiesto - Grapevine (Tujamo Remix)
 Hugel - WTF (Tujamo Remix)
2020
 Debonair Samir - Samir's Theme (Tujamo Remix)
2021
 Sigma & Louis III - Anywhere (Tujamo Remix)

Awards and nominations

Top 100 DJs

References

Living people
Electro house musicians
German house musicians
German DJs
Electronic dance music DJs
1988 births